The United States federal World War Foreign Debts Commission Act of February 9, 1922 authorized the creation of a commission, working under Secretary of the Treasury Andrew Mellon, to negotiate repayment agreements with Great Britain and France in the aftermath of World War I.  

The Commission placed the Allied debt principal to the United States at $11 billion; payments were to be made in graduated 62 annual installments; however, the accrued interest on these payments over a period of 62 years would have increased the debt to approximately $22 billion, although the U.S. did agree to lowered interest rates. Great Britain's debt was reduced 19.7% to $4.6 billion with the interest rate reduced from 5% to 3% for the first ten years of payment to be raised to 3½% thereafter. France's debt was reduced by 52.8% to $4 billion, without any interest for the first five years of payment. It was then to be increased gradually to 3½%.

References

1922 in American law
United States federal legislation
Report of the World War Foreign Debt Commission, May 2, 1923
https://www.finance.senate.gov/imo/media/doc/68PrtSDOC23.pdf

Negotiations on behalf of the World War Foreign Debt Commission for the settlement or refunding of debts owed the United States by foreign governments (Documents 116-143)
https://history.state.gov/historicaldocuments/frus1922v01/ch3

Combined Annual Reports of the World War Foreign Debt Commission with Additional Information Regarding Foreign Debts Due the United States: Fiscal Years 1922, 1923, 1924, 1925 and 1926
https://books.google.com/books/about/Combined_Annual_Reports_of_the_World_War.html?id=6ovPAAAAMAAJ

Foreign Indebtedness to the United States, Committee on Finance, US Senate, October 29, 1973
https://www.finance.senate.gov/imo/media/doc/foreign1.pdf

Complications for the United States from International Credits: 1913 -1940, George J. Hall Thomas J. Sargent, June 18, 2019
http://www.tomsargent.com/research/IMF_final.pdf

P.L. 67-139; 42 Stat.363, February 9, 1922 – Established the Commission; five members 
P.L. 67-445, 42 Stat. 1325, February 28, 1923 – Increased membership to eight
P.L. 67-327; 43 Stat. 763, January 21, 1925 – Extended life of Commission for two more years